Christopher Joseph Hayes (born August 24, 1946) is a Canadian former professional ice hockey player, most notable for the single game he played in the 1972 Stanley Cup semifinals for the eventual Stanley Cup champion Boston Bruins, his sole National Hockey League action.

Biography
He grew up in Chapeau, Quebec, a small village bordering on the Ottawa Valley. Hayes spent three years playing junior hockey for Oshawa 1965-68. He left hockey for two years, but returned in the 1970-71 season to play for Loyola College in Montreal. He then turned pro playing in four pro leagues for five different teams in a four-year span.

While playing for the Oklahoma City Blazers of the Central Hockey League in 1972, Hayes was called up due to injuries to play for the Boston Bruins. He played one game in the 1972 playoffs:  Game #3 of Boston's semifinal series in St. Louis versus the Blues.  Boston won 7-2.  Hayes recorded no points and no penalty minutes, but he did serve a Boston bench penalty for too many men on the ice.  Hayes never played in the NHL again.  Although Hayes was entitled to have his name engraved on the Stanley Cup for having appeared in a playoff game, it was not. Hayes was not re-signed by the Boston organization after the end of the 1973-74 season, and played four games in the NAHL in 1975-76, his final professional action. In April 2018, Chris Hayes finally received his Stanley Cup ring after Boston's team president Cam Neely learned about Hayes' situation.

Career statistics

Regular season and playoffs

See also
List of players who played only one game in the NHL

References

External links
 

1946 births
Living people
Albuquerque Six-Guns players
Anglophone Quebec people
Boston Braves (AHL) players
Boston Bruins players
Canadian ice hockey left wingers
Ice hockey people from Quebec
Mohawk Valley Comets (NAHL) players
Oklahoma City Blazers (1965–1977) players
Oshawa Generals players
Sportspeople from Rouyn-Noranda
Stanley Cup champions
Undrafted National Hockey League players
Canadian expatriate ice hockey players in the United States